Joël Bouchoucha (born 3 January 1976 in Nîmes) is a French professional footballer. He currently plays for French side AS Yzeure.

Bouchoucha played for St. Étienne prior to joining Nîmes in 1996. After scoring at least 12 goals a season for Nîmes in 1996-97, 1997–98 and 1998–99, he joined Torquay United on trial in September 1999. After a week on trial, Torquay manager Wes Saunders decided that Bouchoucha was not the target-man style forward (or even as tall as) he had been expecting and Bouchoucha returned to Nîmes. On 23 September 1999 he joined Hartlepool United on trial, but again failed to win a contract. He also spent some time at Carlisle United and at Portuguese side Vilanovense. In January 2000 he joined Finnish side FF Jaro.

He joined AS Yzeure in July 2004. He scored 25 goals in 32 games for Yzeure in the 2006-07 season and remains with the club in the 2008-09 season.

Career history
Correct as of December 10, 2008

References

1976 births
Living people
French footballers
AS Saint-Étienne players
Nîmes Olympique players
FF Jaro players
Moulins Yzeure Foot players
Footballers from Nîmes
Association football forwards
French expatriate footballers
Expatriate footballers in Finland
French expatriate sportspeople in Finland